(Lucy) Grace Dibble (1902-1998) was a British teacher, traveller and travel writer. She wrote as L. Grace Dibble.

Life
Lucy Grace Dibble was born on 3 October 1902 in Basingstoke. The family moved to Kent when she was a child, eventually moving to a house in Bearsted, Mount Pleasant, that had earlier belonged to the cricketer Alfred Mynn. She was educated at Maidstone Grammar School for Girls before training as a teacher at Homerton College, Cambridge. She gained a University of Cambridge Diploma in Geography, followed by an honours degree in geography from the University of London.

Dibble taught in Winnipeg, Canada, Poona, India and in various colleges in Nigeria. Upon retirement to Kent, she embarked upon a new career as a travel writer.

She died on 3 September 1998.

Works
 Return tickets, 1968
 Return tickets to Scandinavia, 1982
 Return tickets to Yugoslavia, 1984
 Return tickets here and there, 1988
 No return tickets!, 1989
 Return tickets to Africa, 1992
 Return tickets in pictures for armchair globetrotters, 1996
 Return tickets to sacred places, 1996

References

1902 births
1998 deaths
British travel writers
Alumni of Homerton College, Cambridge
British women travel writers
People from Basingstoke
People from Bearsted